Bourbon chicken is a dish named after Bourbon Street in New Orleans, Louisiana, and for the bourbon whiskey ingredient. The dish is commonly found at Cajun-themed and Chinese restaurants.

The recipe includes soy sauce, brown sugar, ginger, and bourbon whiskey in the base, and the chicken is marinated in this sauce. Honey can also be used in the marinade.

See also
Drunken chicken
 List of chicken dishes

References

Asian-American culture in Louisiana
Louisiana cuisine
American Chinese chicken dishes
Ginger dishes
Bourbon whiskey
Honey dishes
Foods with alcoholic drinks